Polydesmopeltis kelaarti is a species of millipedes in the family Pyrgodesmidae. It is endemic to Sri Lanka. Three subspecies recognized. It is found from grass fields rich in organic matter and damp bricks with favorable shady conditions.

Subspecies
Polydesmopeltis kelaarti carli Verhoeff, 1936
Polydesmopeltis kelaarti longipes Verhoeff, 1936
Polydesmopeltis kelaarti valparaiensis Carl, 1932

References

Polydesmida
Animals described in 1865
Millipedes of Asia